This is a list of programs broadcast on Disney Channel (Latin America). It does not include other countries, Disney XD, Disney Junior or Radio Disney programs. All programs are dubbed in Spanish.

Programming

Current programming

Original live-action series (from Disney Channel US)

Original animated series (from Disney Channel US)

Original live-action series (from Disney Channel Latin America) 

Original animated series (from Disney Channel Latin America)

Reruns of Former original live-action series (from Disney Channel US)

Reruns of Former original animated series (from Disney Channel US)

Acquired animated series

Acquired live-action series 

Reruns series from the defunct Disney XD

Former programming

Explanatory notes

References

Disney Channel (Latin American TV channel) original programming
Lists of television series by network
Disney Channel related-lists